Neocolonialism is the continuation or reimposition of imperialist rule by a state (usually, a former colonial power) over another nominally independent state (usually, a former colony). Neocolonialism takes the form of economic imperialism, globalization, cultural imperialism and conditional aid to influence or control a developing country instead of the previous colonial methods of direct military control or indirect political control (hegemony).

Neocolonialism differs from standard globalisation and development aid in that it typically results in a relationship of dependence, subservience, or financial obligation towards the neocolonialist nation. This may result in an undue degree of political control or spiraling debt obligations, functionally imitating the relationship of traditional colonialism. Neocolonialism frequently affects all levels of society, creating neo-colonial systems that disadvantage local communities, such as neo-colonial science.

Coined by the French philosopher Jean-Paul Sartre in 1956, it was first used by Kwame Nkrumah in the context of African countries undergoing decolonisation in the 1960s. Neocolonialism is also discussed in the works of Western thinkers such as Sartre (Colonialism and Neocolonialism, 1964) and Noam Chomsky (The Washington Connection and Third World Fascism, 1979).

Term

Origins 
When first proposed, neocolonialism labelled European countries' continued economic and cultural relationships with their former colonies, African countries that had been liberated in the aftermath of Second World War. At the 1962 National Union of Popular Forces conference, Mehdi Ben Barka, the Moroccan political organizer and later chair of the Tricontinental Conference 1966, used the term al-isti'mar al-jadid ( "the new colonialism") to describe the political trends in Africa in the early sixties.

Kwame Nkrumah, president of Ghana (1960–1966), coined the term, which appeared in the 1963 preamble of the Organisation of African Unity Charter, and was the title of his 1965 book Neo-Colonialism, the Last Stage of Imperialism (1965). Nkrumah theoretically developed and extended to the post–War 20th century the socio-economic and political arguments presented by Lenin in the pamphlet Imperialism, the Highest Stage of Capitalism (1917). The pamphlet frames 19th-century imperialism as the logical extension of geopolitical power, to meet the financial investment needs of the political economy of capitalism. In Neo-Colonialism, the Last Stage of Imperialism, Kwame Nkrumah wrote:

Françafrique

The representative example of European neocolonialism is Françafrique, the "French Africa" constituted by the continued close relationships between France and its former African colonies.

In 1955, the initial usage of the term "French Africa", by President Félix Houphouët-Boigny of Ivory Coast, denoted positive social, cultural and economic Franco–African relations.
It was later applied by neocolonialism critics to describe an imbalanced international relation.

Neocolonialism was used to describe a type of foreign intervention in countries belonging to the Pan-Africanist movement, as well as the Asian–African Conference of Bandung (1955), which led to the Non-Aligned Movement (1961).
Neocolonialism was formally defined by the All-African Peoples' Conference (AAPC) and published in the Resolution on Neo-colonialism. At both the Tunis conference (1960) and the Cairo conference (1961), AAPC described the actions of the French Community of independent states, organised by France, as neocolonial.

The politician Jacques Foccart, the principal adviser for African matters to French presidents Charles de Gaulle (1958–1969) and Georges Pompidou (1969–1974), was the principal proponent of Françafrique.

The works of Verschave and Beti reported a forty-year, post-independence relationship with France's former colonial peoples, which featured colonial garrisons in situ and monopolies by French multinational corporations, usually for the exploitation of mineral resources. It was argued that the African leaders with close ties to France—especially during the Soviet–American Cold War (1945–1991)—acted more as agents of French business and geopolitical interests than as the national leaders of sovereign states. Cited examples are Omar Bongo (Gabon), Félix Houphouët-Boigny (Ivory Coast), Gnassingbé Eyadéma (Togo), Denis Sassou-Nguesso (Republic of the Congo), Idriss Déby (Chad), and Hamani Diori (Niger).

Belgian Congo
Belgium's approach to Belgian Congo has been characterized as a quintessential example of neocolonialism, as the Belgians embraced rapid decolonization of the Congo with the expectation that the newly independent state would become dependent on Belgium. This dependence would allow the Belgians to exert control over Congo, even though Congo was formally independent.

After a failed attempt to nationalise the mining industry in the 1960s, it was reopened to foreign investment.

Neocolonial economic dominance

In 1961, regarding the economic mechanism of  neocolonial control, in the speech Cuba: Historical Exception or Vanguard in the Anti-colonial Struggle?, Argentine revolutionary Che Guevara said:

Dependency theory

Dependency theory is the theoretical description of economic neocolonialism. It proposes that the global economic system comprises wealthy countries at the centre, and poor countries at the periphery. Economic neocolonialism extracts the human and natural resources of a poor country to flow to the economies of the wealthy countries. It claims that the poverty of the peripheral countries is the result of how they are integrated in the global economic system. Dependency theory derives from the Marxist analysis of economic inequalities within the world's system of economies, thus, under-development of the periphery is a direct result of development in the centre. It includes the concept of the late 19th century semi-colony. It contrasts the Marxist perspective of the theory of colonial dependency with capitalist economics. The latter proposes that poverty is a development stage in the poor country's progress towards full integration in the global economic system. Proponents of dependency theory, such as Venezuelan historian Federico Brito Figueroa, who investigated the socioeconomic bases of neocolonial dependency, influenced the thinking of the former President of Venezuela, Hugo Chávez.

Cold War

During the mid-to-late 20th century, in the course of the ideological conflict between the U.S. and the U.S.S.R., each country and its satellite states accused each other of practising neocolonialism in their imperial and hegemonic pursuits. The struggle included proxy wars, fought by client states in the decolonised countries. Cuba, the Warsaw Pact bloc, Egypt under Gamal Abdel Nasser (1956–1970) et al. accused the U.S. of sponsoring anti-democratic governments whose regimes did not represent the interests of their people and of overthrowing elected governments (African, Asian, Latin American) that did not support U.S. geopolitical interests.

In the 1960s, under the leadership of Chairman Mehdi Ben Barka, the Cuban Tricontinental Conference (Organisation of Solidarity with the People of Asia, Africa and Latin America) recognised and supported the validity of revolutionary anti-colonialism as a means for colonised peoples of the Third World to achieve self-determination, a policy which angered the U.S. and France. Moreover, Chairman Barka headed the Commission on Neocolonialism, which dealt with the work to resolve the neocolonial involvement of colonial powers in decolonised counties; and said that the U.S., as the leading capitalist country of the world, was, in practise, the principal neocolonialist political actor.

Multinational corporations

Critics of neocolonialism also argue that investment by multinational corporations enriches few in underdeveloped countries and causes humanitarian, environmental and ecological damage to their populations. They argue that this results in unsustainable development and perpetual underdevelopment. These countries remain reservoirs of cheap labor and raw materials, while restricting access to advanced production techniques to develop their own economies. In some countries, monopolization of natural resources, while initially leading to an influx of investment, is often followed by increases in unemployment, poverty and a decline in per-capita income.

In the West African nations of Guinea-Bissau, Senegal and Mauritania, fishing was historically central to the economy. Beginning in 1979, the European Union began negotiating contracts with governments for fishing off the coast of West Africa. Unsustainable commercial over-fishing by foreign fleets played a significant role in large-scale unemployment and migration of people across the region. This violates the United Nations Convention on the Law of the Sea, which recognises the importance of fishing to local communities and insists that government fishing agreements with foreign companies should target only surplus stocks.

International borrowing

American economist Jeffrey Sachs recommended that the entire African debt (c. US$200 billion) be dismissed, and recommended that African nations not repay the World Bank and the International Monetary Fund (IMF):

Conservation and neocolonialism
Wallerstein, and separately Frank, claim that the modern conservation movement, as practiced by international organisations such as the World Wide Fund for Nature, inadvertently developed a neocolonial relationship with underdeveloped nations.

Science

United States

There is an ongoing debate about whether certain actions by the United States should be considered neocolonialism. Nayna J. Jhaveri, writing in Antipode, views the 2003 invasion of Iraq as a form of "petroimperialism", believing that the U.S. was motivated to go to war to attain vital oil reserves, rather than to pursue the U.S. government's official rationale for the Iraq War ("a preemptive strike to disarm Saddam Hussein of his weapons of mass destruction").

Noam Chomsky has been a prominent critic of "American imperialism"; he believes that the basic principle of the foreign policy of the United States is the establishment of "open societies" that are economically and politically controlled by the United States and where U.S.-based businesses can prosper. He argues that the U.S. seeks to suppress any movements within these countries that are not compliant with U.S. interests and to ensure that U.S.-friendly governments are placed in power. When discussing current events, he emphasizes their place within a wider historical perspective. He believes that official, sanctioned historical accounts of U.S. and British extraterritorial operations have consistently whitewashed these nations' actions in order to present them as having benevolent motives in either spreading democracy or, in older instances, spreading Christianity; criticizing these accounts, he seeks to correct them. Prominent examples he regularly cites are the actions of the British Empire in India and Africa and the actions of the U.S. in Vietnam, the Philippines, Latin America, and the Middle East.

Chomsky's political work has centered heavily on criticizing the actions of the United States. He has said he focuses on the U.S. because the country has militarily and economically dominated the world during his lifetime and because its liberal democratic electoral system allows the citizenry to influence government policy. His hope is that, by spreading awareness of the impact U.S. foreign policies have on the populations affected by them, he can sway the populations of the U.S. and other countries into opposing the policies. He urges people to criticize their governments' motivations, decisions, and actions, to accept responsibility for their own thoughts and actions, and to apply the same standards to others as to themselves. Chomsky has been critical of U.S. involvement in the Israeli–Palestinian conflict, arguing that it has consistently blocked a peaceful settlement. Chomsky also criticizes the U.S.'s close ties with Saudi Arabia and involvement in Saudi Arabian-led intervention in Yemen, highlighting that Saudi Arabia has "one of the most grotesque human rights records in the world".

Chalmers Johnson argued in 2004 that America's version of the colony is the military base. Johnson wrote numerous books, including three examinations of the consequences of what he called the "American Empire": Blowback, The Sorrows of Empire, and Nemesis; The Last Days of the American Republic.

US "Benevolent" imperialism 

International relations scholar Joseph Nye argues that U.S. power is more and more based on "soft power", which comes from cultural hegemony rather than raw military or economic force. This includes such factors as the widespread desire to emigrate to the United States, the prestige and corresponding high proportion of foreign students at U.S. universities, and the spread of U.S. styles of popular music and cinema. Mass immigration into America may justify this hypothesis, but it is hard to know whether the United States would still maintain its prestige without its military and economic superiority.

US foreign policy and the CIA 

The Invisible Government is a 1964 non-fiction book by David Wise and Thomas B. Ross, published by Random House. The book described the operations and activities of the Central Intelligence Agency (CIA) at the time. Christopher Wright of Columbia University wrote that the book argues "that to a significant extent major policies of the United States in the cold war are established and implemented with the help of government mechanisms and procedures that are invisible to the public and seem to lack the usual political and budgetary constraints on their activities and personnel."
The New York Times described the book as "a journalistic, dramatic narrative that may move us toward a fundamental reappraisal of where secret operations fit into a democratic nation." Wise stated that when the work was published, ordinary people generally had little knowledge of what the CIA did, and that the book "was the first serious study of the CIA’s activities", something that the CIA disliked. Wright added that "Subsequent admissions and appraisals ... have further substantiated the reports ... and reinforced the main thesis".

The CIA has been involved in the training and support of death squads that suppressed dissent against US-backed right-wing dictatorships in Latin America. Florencio Caballero, a former Honduran Army interrogator, said that he had been trained by the Central Intelligence Agency, which the New York Times confirmed with US and Honduran officials. Much of his account was confirmed by three American and two Honduran officials, and may be the fullest given of how army and police units were authorized to organize death squads that seized, interrogated and killed suspected leftists. He said that while Argentine and Chilean trainers taught the Honduran Army kidnapping and elimination techniques, the CIA explicitly forbade the use of physical torture or assassination. In addition to the CIA's support of death squads in Latin America, Human Rights Watch asserted in a 2019 report that the CIA backed similar death squads in Afghanistan. The CIA, in addition to aiding, supporting, participating in, and supporting death squads in Latin America, has also committed human rights violations via the overthrow of democratically elected governments. Following the September 11 attacks, the CIA engaged in the torture of detainees at CIA-run black sites and sent detainees to be tortured by friendly governments in a manner contravening both US and international law.

Regime change 

United States involvement in regime change has entailed both overt and covert actions aimed at altering, replacing, or preserving foreign governments. In the latter half of the 19th century, the U.S. government initiated actions for regime change mainly in Latin America and the southwest Pacific, including the Spanish–American and Philippine–American wars. At the onset of the 20th century, the United States shaped or installed governments in many countries around the world, including neighbors Panama, Honduras, Nicaragua, Mexico, Haiti, and the Dominican Republic.

During World War II, the United States helped overthrow many Nazi Germany and imperial Japanese puppet regimes. Examples include regimes in the Philippines, Korea, the Eastern portion of China, and much of Europe. United States forces were also instrumental in ending the rule of Adolf Hitler over Germany and of Benito Mussolini over Italy.  After World War II, the United States in 1945 ratified the UN Charter, the preeminent international law document, which legally bound the U.S. government to the Charter's provisions, including Article 2(4), which prohibits the threat or use of force in international relations, except in very limited circumstances. Therefore, any legal claim advanced to justify regime change by a foreign power carries a particularly heavy burden.

In the aftermath of World War II, the U.S. government struggled with the Soviet Union for global leadership, influence and security within the context of the Cold War. Under the Eisenhower administration, the U.S. government feared that national security would be compromised by governments propped by the Soviet Union's own involvement in regime change and promoted the domino theory, with later presidents following Eisenhower's precedent. Subsequently, the United States expanded the geographic scope of its actions beyond traditional area of operations, Central America and the Caribbean. Significant operations included the United States and United Kingdom-orchestrated 1953 Iranian coup d'état, the 1961 Bay of Pigs Invasion targeting Cuba, and support for the overthrow of Sukarno by General Suharto in Indonesia. In addition, the U.S. has interfered in the national elections of countries, including in Japan in the 1950s and 1960s, the Philippines in 1953, and in Lebanon in the 1957 elections using secret cash infusions. According to one study, the U.S. performed at least 81 overt and covert known interventions in foreign elections during the period 1946–2000. Another study found that the U.S. engaged in 64 covert and six overt attempts at regime change during the Cold War.

Following the dissolution of the Soviet Union, the United States has led or supported wars to determine the governance of a number of countries. Stated U.S. aims in these conflicts have included fighting the War on Terror, as in the Afghan war, or removing dictatorial and hostile regimes, as in the Iraq War.

Support of dictatorships and state terrorism

The U.S. has been criticized for supporting dictatorships with economic assistance and military hardware. Particular dictatorships have included Zia and Musharraf of Pakistan, the Shah of Iran, Museveni of Uganda, warlords in Somalia, Fulgencio Batista of Cuba, Ferdinand Marcos of the Philippines, Ngo Dinh Diem of South Vietnam, Park Chung-hee of South Korea, Generalissimo Franco of Spain, António de Oliveira Salazar and Marcelo Caetano of Portugal, Meles Zenawi of Ethiopia, Augusto Pinochet in Chile, Alfredo Stroessner of Paraguay, Efraín Ríos Montt of Guatemala, Jorge Rafael Videla of Argentina, Suharto of Indonesia, Georgios Papadopoulos of Greece, and Hissène Habré of Chad.

Ruth J Blakeley, Professor of Politics and International Relations at the University of Sheffield, posits that the United States and its allies sponsored and facilitated state terrorism on an "enormous scale" during the Cold War. The justification given for this was to contain Communism, but Blakeley says it was also a means by which to buttress the interests of US business elites and to promote the expansion of capitalism and neoliberalism in the Global South.

J. Patrice McSherry, a professor of political science at Long Island University, states that "hundreds of thousands of Latin Americans were tortured, abducted or killed by right-wing military regimes as part of the US-led anti-communist crusade," which included US support for Operation Condor and the Guatemalan military during the Guatemalan Civil War. According to Latin Americanist John Henry Coatsworth, the number of repression victims in Latin America alone far surpassed that of the Soviet Union and its East European satellites during the period 1960 to 1990. Mark Aarons asserts that the atrocities carried out by Western-backed dictatorships rival those of the communist world.

Some experts assert that the US directly facilitated and encouraged the mass murder of hundreds of thousands of suspected Communists in Indonesia during the mid-1960s. Bradley Simpson, Director of the Indonesia/East Timor Documentation Project at the National Security Archive, says "Washington did everything in its power to encourage and facilitate the army-led massacre of alleged PKI members, and U.S. officials worried only that the killing of the party's unarmed supporters might not go far enough, permitting Sukarno to return to power and frustrate the [Johnson] Administration's emerging plans for a post-Sukarno Indonesia." According to Simpson, the terror in Indonesia was an "essential building block of the quasi neo-liberal policies the West would attempt to impose on Indonesia in the years to come". Historian John Roosa, commenting on documents released from the US embassy in Jakarta in 2017, says they confirm that "the U.S. was part and parcel of the operation, strategizing with the Indonesian army and encouraging them to go after the PKI." Geoffrey B. Robinson, historian at UCLA, argues that without the support of the U.S. and other powerful Western states, the Indonesian Army's program of mass killings would not have occurred.

The U.S. has been accused of complicity in war crimes for backing the Saudi Arabian-led intervention in Yemen, which has triggered a humanitarian catastrophe, including a cholera outbreak and millions facing starvation.

U.S. military bases 

Chalmers Johnson argued in 2004 that America's version of the colony is the military base. Chip Pitts argued similarly in 2006 that enduring U.S. bases in Iraq suggested a vision of "Iraq as a colony".

While territories such as Guam, the United States Virgin Islands, the Northern Mariana Islands, American Samoa, and Puerto Rico remain under U.S. control, the U.S. allowed many of its overseas territories or occupations to gain independence after World War II. Examples include the Philippines (1946), the Panama Canal Zone (1979), Palau (1981), the Federated States of Micronesia (1986), and the Marshall Islands (1986). Most of them still have U.S. bases within their territories. In the case of Okinawa, which came under U.S. administration after the Battle of Okinawa during the Second World War, this happened despite local popular opinion on the island. In 2003, a Department of Defense distribution found the United States had bases in over 36 countries worldwide, including the Camp Bondsteel base in the disputed territory of Kosovo. Since 1959, Cuba has regarded the U.S. presence in Guantánamo Bay as illegal.

In 2015, David Vine's book, Base Nation, found 800 U.S. military bases located outside of the U.S., including 174 bases in Germany, 113 in Japan, and 83 in South Korea. The total cost: an estimated $100 billion a year.

According to The Huffington Post, "The 45 nations and territories with little or no democratic rule represent more than half of the roughly 80 countries now hosting U.S. bases. ... Research by political scientist Kent Calder confirms what's come to be known as the "dictatorship hypothesis": The United States tends to support dictators [and other undemocratic regimes] in nations where it enjoys basing facilities."

Other countries and entities

Catholic Church
Historically there has been a strong connection between Christianity and colonialism.

Although not always aligned with colonial policy, for example in its opposition to slavery in the Americas, modern senior Catholic churchmen have been prominent in their pronouncements about the peoples of former colonial territories, especially during the pontificate of Pope Francis. Thus at the 2014 Synod on the Family, Cardinal Walter Kasper said that African Catholics "should not tell us too much what we have to do." During the 2019 Synod on the Amazon, Austrian-born Bishop Erwin Kräutler, a former bishop in Brazil, said at the October 9 Synod press conference that "there is no alternative" to abolishing celibacy in the Amazon basin because the natives "don’t understand celibacy".

China 

The People's Republic of China has built increasingly strong ties with some African, Asian, European and Latin American nations which has led to accusations of colonialism, becoming Africa's largest trading partner in 2009. As of August 2007, an estimated 750,000 Chinese nationals were working or living for extended periods in Africa. In the 1980s and 90s, China continued to purchase natural resources—petroleum and minerals—from Africa to fuel the Chinese economy and to finance international business enterprises. In 2006, trade had increased to $50 billion expanding to $500 billion by 2016.

In Africa, China has loaned $95.5 billion to various countries between 2000 and 2015, the majority being spent on power generation and infrastructure. Cases in which this has ended with China acquiring foreign land have led to accusations of "debt-trap diplomacy". Other analysts have concluded that China is likely trying to "stockpile international support for contentious political issues."

Commentators have stated that Western perceptions of China's motives are misconstrued due to Western conceptions of development as seen through their own lens of exploitation of others for resources—as exemplified by European colonialism—instead of through Chinese conceptions of development.

In 2018, Malaysian Prime Minister Mahathir Mohamad cancelled two China-funded projects. He also talked about fears of Malaysia becoming "indebted" and of a "new version of colonialism". He later clarified that he did not refer to the Belt and Road Initiative or China with this.

Langan (2017) stated that Western actors tend to paint China as a threat in Africa, othering it from themselves, but it neglects the fact that Europe, the United States, China, and other emerging powers likewise facilitate economic and political interests through aid and trade in a manner that conflicts with African sovereignty.

Niue
The government of Niue has been trying to get back access to its domain name, .nu. The country signed a deal with a Massachusetts-based non-profit in 1999 that gave away rights to the domain name. Management of the domain name has since shifted to a Swedish organisation. The Niue government is currently fighting on two fronts to get back control on its domain name, including with the ICANN. Toke Talagi, the long-serving Premier of Niue who died in 2020, called it a form of neocolonialism.

South Korean land acquisitions

To ensure a reliable, long-term supply of food, the South Korean government and powerful Korean multinationals bought farming rights to millions of hectares of agricultural land in under-developed countries.

South Korea's RG Energy Resources Asset Management CEO Park Yong-soo stressed that "the nation does not produce a single drop of crude oil and other key industrial minerals. To power economic growth and support people's livelihoods, we cannot emphasise too much that securing natural resources in foreign countries is a must for our future survival." The head of the Food and Agriculture Organization (FAO), Jacques Diouf, stated that the rise in land deals could create a form of "neocolonialism", with poor states producing food for the rich at the expense of their own hungry people.

In 2008, South Korean multinational Daewoo Logistics secured 1.3 million hectares of farmland in Madagascar to grow maize and crops for biofuels. Roughly half of the country's arable land, as well as rainforests were to be converted into palm and corn monocultures, producing food for export from a country where a third of the population and 50 percent of children under five are malnourished, using South African workers instead of locals. Local residents were not consulted or informed, despite being dependent on the land for food and income. The controversial deal played a major part in prolonged anti-government protests that resulted in over a hundred deaths. This was a source of popular resentment that contributed to the fall of then-President Marc Ravalomanana. The new president, Andry Rajoelina, cancelled the deal. Tanzania later announced that South Korea was in talks to develop 100,000 hectares for food production and processing for 700 to 800 billion won. Scheduled to be completed in 2010, it was to be the largest single piece of overseas South Korean agricultural infrastructure ever built.

In 2009, Hyundai Heavy Industries acquired a majority stake in a company cultivating 10,000 hectares of farmland in the Russian Far East and a South Korean provincial government secured 95,000 hectares of farmland in Oriental Mindoro, central Philippines, to grow corn. The South Jeolla province became the first provincial government to benefit from a new central government fund to develop farmland overseas, receiving a loan of $1.9 million. The project was expected to produce 10,000 tonnes of feed in the first year. South Korean multinationals and provincial governments purchased land in Sulawesi, Indonesia, Cambodia and Bulgan, Mongolia. The national South Korean government announced its intention to invest 30 billion won in land in Paraguay and Uruguay. As of 2009 discussions with Laos, Myanmar and Senegal were underway.

Cultural approaches
Although the concept of neocolonialism was originally developed within a Marxist theoretical framework and is generally employed by the political left, the term "neocolonialism" is found in other theoretical frameworks.

Coloniality
"Coloniality" claims that knowledge production is strongly influenced by the context of the person producing the knowledge and that this has further disadvantaged developing countries with limited knowledge production infrastructure. It originated among critics of subaltern theories, which, although strongly de-colonial, are less concerned with the source of knowledge.

Cultural theory

One variant of neocolonialism theory critiques cultural colonialism, the desire of wealthy nations to control other nations' values and perceptions through cultural means such as media, language, education and religion, ultimately for economic reasons. One impact of this is "colonial mentality", feelings of inferiority that lead post-colonial societies to latch onto physical and cultural differences between the foreigners and themselves. Foreign ways become held in higher esteem than indigenous ways. Given that colonists and colonisers were generally of different races, the colonised may over time hold that the colonisers' race was responsible for their superiority. Rejections of the colonisers culture, such as the Negritude movement, have been employed to overcome these associations. Post-colonial importation or continuation of cultural mores or elements may be regarded as a form of neocolonialism.

Postcolonialism

Post-colonialism theories in philosophy, political science, literature and film deal with the cultural legacy of colonial rule. Post-colonialism studies examine how once-colonised writers articulate their national identity; how knowledge about the colonised was generated and applied in service to the interests of the coloniser; and how colonialist literature justified colonialism by presenting the colonised people as inferior whose society, culture and economy must be managed for them. Post-colonial studies incorporate subaltern studies of "history from below"; post-colonial cultural evolution; the psychopathology of colonisation (by Frantz Fanon); and the cinema of film makers such as the Cuban Third Cinema, e.g. Tomás Gutiérrez Alea, and Kidlat Tahimik.

Critical theory
Critiques of postcolonialism/neocolonialism are evident in literary theory. International relations theory defined "postcolonialism" as a field of study. While the lasting effects of cultural colonialism are of central interest, the intellectual antecedents in cultural critiques of neocolonialism are economic. Critical international relations theory references neocolonialism from Marxist positions as well as postpositivist positions, including postmodernist, postcolonial and feminist approaches. These differ from both realism and liberalism in their epistemological and ontological premises. The neo-liberalist approach tends to depict modern forms of colonialism as a benevolent imperialism.

Neocolonialism and gender construction 
Concepts of neocolonialism can be found in theoretical works investigating gender outside the global north. Often these conceptions can be seen as erasing gender diversity within communities in the global south to create conceptions of gender that align with the global north. Gerise Herndon argues that applying feminism or other theoretical frameworks around gender must look at the relationship between the individual subject, their home country or culture, and the country and culture that exerts neocolonial control over the country. In her piece "Gender Construction and Neocolonialism", Herndon presents the writings of Maryse Condé as an example of grappling with what it means to have your identity constructed by neocolonial powers. Her work explores how women in burgeoning nations rebuilt their identities in the postcolonial period. The task of creating new identities was met with challenges from not only an internal view of what the culture was in these places but also from the external expectations of ex-colonial powers.

An example of the construction of gender norms and conceptions by neocolonial interests is made clear in the Ugandan Anti-Homosexuality Act passed in 2014. The act, first introduced in 2009, made gay relationships illegal. Prohibition against homosexual relationships was previously covered by laws against sodomy but expanded to include community policing of homosexual people. Infringing this act would be punished by jail time. The act also introduced life sentences for anyone who participated in aggravated Homosexuality or was found trying to marry a same-sex partner. The call for this bill came from Ugandans who claimed traditional African values that did not include homosexuality. This act faced backlash from western countries, citing human rights violations. The Ugandan response was to claim that this was a neocolonialist attack on their culture. Kristen Cheney argued that this is a misrepresentation of neocolonialism at work and that this conception of gender and anti-homosexuality erased historically diverse gender identities in Africa. To Cheney, neocolonialism was found in accepting conservative gender identity politics, specifically those of U.S.-based Evangelical Christians. Before the introduction of this act, conservative Christian groups in the United States had put African religious leaders and politicians on their payroll, reflecting the talking points of U.S.-based Christian evangelism. Cheney argues that this adoption and bankrolling of U.S. conservative Christian evangelist thought in Uganda is the real neocolonialism and effectively erodes any historical gender diversity in Africa.

See also

References

Further reading

 Opoku Agyeman. Nkrumah's Ghana and East Africa: Pan-Africanism and African interstate relations (Fairleigh Dickinson University Press, 1992).
 
 Bill Ashcroft (ed., et al.) The post-colonial studies reader (Routledge, London, 1995).
 Yolamu R Barongo. neo-colonialism and African politics: A survey of the impact of neo-colonialism on African political behavior (Vantage Press, NY, 1980).
 Mongo Beti, Main basse sur le Cameroun. Autopsie d'une décolonisation (1972), new edition La Découverte, Paris 2003 [A classical critique of neo-colonialism. Raymond Marcellin, the French Minister of the Interior at the time, tried to prohibit the book. It could only be published after fierce legal battles.]
 Frédéric Turpin. De Gaulle, Pompidou et l'Afrique (1958-1974): décoloniser et coopérer (Les Indes savantes, Paris, 2010. [Grounded on Foccart's previously inaccessibles archives]
 Kum-Kum Bhavnani. (ed., et al.) Feminist futures: Re-imagining women, culture and development (Zed Books, NY, 2003). See: Ming-yan Lai's "Of Rural Mothers, Urban Whores and Working Daughters: Women and the Critique of Neocolonial Development in Taiwan's Nativist Literature," pp. 209–225.
 David Birmingham. The decolonisation of Africa (Ohio University Press, 1995).
 Charles Cantalupo(ed.). The world of Ngugi wa Thiong'o (Africa World Press, 1995).
 Laura Chrisman and Benita Parry (ed.) Postcolonial theory and criticism (English Association, Cambridge, 2000).
 Renato Constantino. Neocolonial identity and counter-consciousness: Essays on cultural decolonisation (Merlin Press, London, 1978).
 George A. W. Conway. A responsible complicity: Neo/colonial power-knowledge and the work of Foucault, Said, Spivak (University of Western Ontario Press, 1996).
 Julia V. Emberley. Thresholds of difference: feminist critique, native women's writings, postcolonial theory (University of Toronto Press, 1993).
 Nikolai Aleksandrovich Ermolov. Trojan horse of neo-colonialism: U.S. policy of training specialists for developing countries (Progress Publishers, Moscow, 1966).
 Thomas Gladwin. Slaves of the white myth: The psychology of neo-colonialism (Humanities Press, Atlantic Highlands, NJ, 1980).
 Lewis Gordon. Her Majesty's Other Children: Sketches of Racism from a Neocolonial Age (Rowman & Littlefield, 1997).
 Ankie M. M. Hoogvelt. Globalisation and the postcolonial world: The new political economy of development (Johns Hopkins University Press, 2001).
 J. M. Hobson, The Eastern Origins of Western Civilisation (Cambridge University Press, 2004).
  M. B. Hooker. Legal pluralism; an introduction to colonial and neo-colonial laws (Clarendon Press, Oxford, 1975).
 E.M. Kramer (ed.) The emerging monoculture: assimilation and the "model minority" (Praeger, Westport, Conn., 2003). See: Archana J. Bhatt's "Asian Indians and the Model Minority Narrative: A Neocolonial System," pp. 203–221.
 Geir Lundestad (ed.) The fall of great powers: Peace, stability, and legitimacy (Scandinavian University Press, Oslo, 1994).
 Jean-Paul Sartre. 'Colonialism and neo-colonialism. Translated by Steve Brewer, Azzedine Haddour, Terry McWilliams Republished in the 2001 edition by Routledge France. .
 Peccia, T., 2014, "The Theory of the Globe Scrambled by Social Networks: A New Sphere of Influence 2.0", Jura Gentium - Rivista di Filosofia del Diritto Internazionale e della Politica Globale, Sezione "L'Afghanistan Contemporaneo", The Theory of the Globe Scrambled by Social Networks
 Stuart J. Seborer. U.S. neo-colonialism in Africa (International Publishers, NY, 1974).
 D. Simon. Cities, capital and development: African cities in the world economy (Halstead, NY, 1992).
 Phillip Singer(ed.) Traditional healing, new science or new colonialism": (essays in critique of medical anthropology) (Conch Magazine, Owerri, 1977).
 Jean Suret-Canale. Essays on African history: From the slave trade to neo-colonialism (Hurst, London 1988).
 Ngũgĩ wa Thiong'o. Barrel of a pen: Resistance to repression in neo-colonial Kenya (Africa Research & Publications Project, 1983).
 Carlos Alzugaray Treto. El ocaso de un régimen neocolonial: Estados Unidos y la dictadura de Batista durante 1958,(The twilight of a neocolonial regime: The United States and Batista during 1958), in Temas: Cultura, Ideología y Sociedad, No.16-17, October 1998/March 1999, pp. 29–41 (La Habana: Ministry of Culture).
 Uzoigw, Godfrey N. "Neocolonialism Is Dead: Long Live Neocolonialism." Journal of Global South Studies 36.1 (2019): 59–87.
 
 Richard Werbner (ed.) Postcolonial identities in Africa (Zed Books, NJ, 1996).

External links

 Mbeki warns on China-Africa ties
 "neocolonialism" in Encyclopedia of Marxism.
 
 Neo-Colonialism: The Last Stage of Imperialism, by Kwame Nkrumah (former Prime Minister and President of Ghana), originally published 1965
 Comments by Prof. Jeffrey Sachs - BBC
 Harvard economist Jeffrey Sachs video (ram) - hosted by Columbia Univ. 
 — IMF: Market Reform and Corporate Globalization , by Dr. Gloria Emeagwali, Prof. of History and African Studies, Conne. State Univ.

Academic course materials
 Sovereignty in the Postcolonial African State, Syllabus : Joseph Hill, University of Rochester, 2008.
 Studying African development history: Study guides, Lauri Siitonen, Päivi Hasu, Wolfgang Zeller. Helsinki University, 2007.

 
European colonisation in Africa
History of colonialism
Imperialism studies